The 1950–51 Yugoslav Ice Hockey League season was the ninth season of the Yugoslav Ice Hockey League, the top level of ice hockey in Yugoslavia. Four teams participated in the league, and Partizan have won the championship.

Regular season

References

External links
Yugoslav Ice Hockey League seasons

Yugo
Yugoslav Ice Hockey League seasons
1950–51 in Yugoslav ice hockey